Rowland Pugh (born 1579, date of death unknown) was a Welsh politician who sat in the House of Commons from 1624 to 1625.

Pugh was the eldest son of Richard ap John ap Hugh, of Mathafarn, Montgomeryshire. He matriculated at Jesus College, Oxford on  14 October 1597, aged 18. He became a student of the Inner Temple in  November 1598. 

In 1624, Pugh was elected Member of Parliament for Cardigan. He was re-elected MP for Cardigan in 1625. He was Steward of Cyperley near Machynlleth. In 1608 and 1625 he was appointed High Sheriff of Montgomeryshire. He was High Sheriff of Merionethshire and High Sheriff of Cardiganshire in 1631. 

Pugh married firstly Elizabeth Pryse, daughter of Sir Richard Pryse of Gogerddan and secondly Mary Lewes daughter of James Lewis of  Coedmawr.

References

1579 births
17th-century deaths
Year of death missing
Members of the Parliament of England (pre-1707) for constituencies in Wales
Members of the Inner Temple
Alumni of Jesus College, Oxford
High Sheriffs of Montgomeryshire
High Sheriffs of Merionethshire
High Sheriffs of Cardiganshire
17th-century Welsh politicians
English MPs 1624–1625
English MPs 1625